The Mamoré–Guaporé linguistic area is a linguistic area that includes over a dozen South American language families and isolates of the Mamoré–Guaporé region of eastern lowland Bolivia (the Llanos de Moxos and Chiquitania regions) and Brazil (Rondonia and Mato Grosso states).

Languages

Crevels and van der Voort (2008) propose a Mamoré–Guaporé linguistic area in eastern lowland Bolivia (in Beni Department and Santa Cruz Department) and Rondonia and northwestern Mato Grosso, Brazil. In Bolivia, many of the languages were historically spoken at the Jesuit Missions of Moxos and also the Jesuit Missions of Chiquitos. Language families and branches in the linguistic area are as follows.

Chapacuran languages
Tacanan languages
a few Panoan languages
Nambikwaran languages
the Arawakan languages Moxo, Bauré, Paunaka, and other related varieties

Tupian branches in the Mamoré–Guaporé linguistic area are:
Ramarama languages
Puruborá language
Mondé languages
Tupari languages
Arikem languages
Guarayo languages (Tupi–Guarani group)
some Guarani dialects (Tupi–Guarani group)

Macro-Jê branches in the Mamoré–Guaporé linguistic area are:
Jabutian languages
Rikbaktsá language
Chiquitano (sister branch of Macro-Jê)

Language isolates in the linguistic area are:
Cayuvava
Itonama
Movima
Chimane/Mosetén
Canichana
Yuracaré
Leco
Mure
Aikanã
Kanoê
Kwazá
Irantxe
Arara

Linguistic features
Areal features include:

 a high incidence of prefixes
 evidentials
 directionals
 verbal number
 lack of nominal number
 lack of classifiers
 inclusive/exclusive distinction

Pieter Muysken et al. (2014) also performed a detailed statistical analysis of the Mamoré–Guaporé linguistic area.

Reconstruction of Proto-Mamoré-Guaporé 
Reconstruction of Proto-Mamoré-Guaporé language according to Jolkesky 2016:

See also
Linguistic areas of the Americas
Chaco linguistic area
Languages of Rondonia (Portuguese Wikipedia)
Indigenous languages of South America

Further reading
 Crevels, M. & van der Voort, H. (2008). The Guaporé-Mamoré region as a linguistic area. In Muysken, P. (eds.), From linguistic areas to areal linguistics. Amsterdam: John Benjamins Pub. Co. 
 Muysken, Pieter; Hammarström, Harald; Birchall, Joshua; Van Gijn, Rik; Krasnoukhova, Olga; Müller, Neele (2014). Linguistic areas: bottom-up or top-down? The case of the Guaporé-Mamoré. In: Comrie, Bernard; Golluscio, Lucia. Language Contact and Documentation / Contacto lingüístico y documentación. Berlin: Walter de Gruyter, 205-238.
 Maldi, Denise. 1991. O Complexo Cultural do Marico: Sociedades Indígenas dos Rios Branco, Colorado e Mequens, Afluentes do Médio Guaporé. Boletim do Museu Paraense Emílio Goeldi, Série Antropologia, vol. 7(2), p. 209-269.
 Meireles, Denise Maldi. 1989. Guardiães da fronteira: Rio Guaporé, século XVIII. Petrópolis: Vozes. ISBN 85-326-0017-4.
 Meirelles, Denise Maldi & Meirelles, Apoena. 1984. Tribos extintas e migrações indígenas em Rondônia (Do século XVII até os primeiros decênios do século XX). Anuário de Divulgação Científica, v. 10, p. 134-45. Goiânia: Universidade Católica de Goiás.
 Nimuendajú, Curt. 1925. As tribus do alto Madeira. Journal de la Société des Américanistes, 17: 137-172.
 Ramirez, Henri. 2006. As línguas indígenas do Alto Madeira: estatuto atual e bibliografia básica. Língua Viva, vol. 1, n. 1.
 Ramirez, Henri. 2010. Etnônimos e topônimos no Madeira (séculos XVI-XX): um sem-número de equívocos. Revista Brasileira de Linguística Antropológica, v. 2 n. 2, p. 179-224.
 Sampaio, W. & da Silva Sinha, V. (2011). Fieldwork data from languages in Rondônia. Diachronic Atlas of Comparative Linguistics (DiACL).

References

External links
 Amazonian Languages of Rondônia and Bolivia collection, Leiden University
 Language diversity of the Guaporé region

 
Sprachbund